Zachary Dwayne Thomas (born September 8, 1960 in Cocoa, Florida) is a former American football wide receiver of the National Football League. He was signed by the Denver Broncos as an undrafted free agent in 1983. He played college football at South Carolina State.

Thomas also played for the Tampa Bay Buccaneers.

1960 births
Living people
People from Cocoa, Florida
Players of American football from Florida
American football wide receivers
American football return specialists
South Carolina State Bulldogs football players
Denver Broncos players
Tampa Bay Buccaneers players